Piwarski is a Polish surname. Notable people with the surname include:

 Adolf Piwarski (1817–1870), Polish painter
 Jan Feliks Piwarski (1794–1859), Polish painter and writer
 Kazimierz Piwarski (1903–1968), Polish historian

Polish-language surnames